Aggressive Behavior is a bimonthly peer-reviewed scientific journal covering research pertaining to aggression in, among other fields, psychology, anthropology, and sociology. It was established in 1974 and is published by John Wiley & Sons on behalf of the International Society for Research on Aggression, of which it is the official journal. The editor-in-chief is Craig Anderson (Iowa State University). According to the Journal Citation Reports, the journal has a 2020 impact factor of 2.917.

References

External links

Psychology journals
Wiley (publisher) academic journals
Publications established in 1974
Bimonthly journals
Academic journals associated with international learned and professional societies